Pseudosphex zethus is a moth of the subfamily Arctiinae. It was described by Jacob Hübner in 1827. It is found in Pará, Brazil.

References

Pseudosphex
Moths described in 1827